Fry, fries, Fry's or frying may refer to:

Food and cooking
 Frying, the cooking of food in hot oil or fat
 French fries, deep-fried potato strips
 Frying pan, cookware for frying

Businesses and organizations
 Fry (racing team), a British Formula Two constructor
 Fry Art Gallery, Saffron Walden, Essex, England
 Fry Group Foods, a South African/Australian manufacturer of vegan meat analogues
 Fry's Electronics, a defunct American retailer
 Fry's Food and Drug, a chain of American supermarkets in Arizona
 J. S. Fry & Sons, a defunct British chocolate manufacturer

Linguistics
 Glottal or vocal fry, in phonetics, a low, croaky register of voicing
 West Frisian language, spoken in the Netherlands (ISO 639 code: fry)

People

 Fry (surname), a British family name (including a list of people and fictional characters so named)
Philip J. Fry, fictional protagonist of animated sitcom Futurama

Places

Antarctica
 Fry Glacier, Victoria Land
 Fry Peak, Palmer Land

Europe
 Federal Republic of Yugoslavia (1992–2006)
 Fry, Seine-Maritime,  a commune in France

North America
 Fry, West Virginia, an unincorporated community in the United States
 Fry's, Saskatchewan,  a former locality in Canada
 Fry Mountains, a mountain range in California, U.S.

Other uses
 Fry (biology), a juvenile stage of aquatic animals
 5190 Fry, an asteroid
 Execution by electrocution (colloquially to fry)

See also
 
 Frye, a surname
 Fray (disambiguation)
 Frey (disambiguation)
 Fried (surname)
 Fyr (disambiguation)